Li Qiyan (October 1938 – 3 June 2020) served as mayor of Beijing from February 1993 to November 1996. He was originally from Qihe County in Shandong province.  Li joined the Chinese Communist Party in November 1961. He was a member of the 14th Central Committee of the Chinese Communist Party.

References

1938 births
Living people
Mayors of Beijing
Chinese Communist Party politicians from Shandong
Politicians from Dezhou
People's Republic of China politicians from Shandong